Miss Polski 2016 was the 27th Miss Polski pageant, held on December 4, 2016. The winner was Paulina Maziarz of Masovia. Maziarz represented Poland in Miss International 2017 and Miss Supranational 2017.

Final results

Special Awards

Finalists

Notes

Did not compete
 Lower Poland
 Lower Silesia
 Upper Poland
 Polish Community in Argentina
 Polish Community in Australia
 Polish Community in Belarus
 Polish Community in Brazil
 Polish Community in Canada
 Polish Community in France
 Polish Community in Germany
 Polish Community in Ireland
 Polish Community in Israel
 Polish Community in Lithuania
 Polish Community in Russia
 Polish Community in South Africa
 Polish Community in Sweden
 Polish Community in the U.K.
 Polish Community in the U.S.
 Polish Community in Venezuela

References

External links
Official Website

2016
2016 beauty pageants
2016 in Poland